The Gariuai Hydroelectric Plant is a run-of-the-river micro hydro power plant located in the town of Gariuai in Baucau District, East Timor. It is the only operational hydroelectric power station in the country. In order to reduce dependency on diesel generators, sites were surveyed in 2004 in Baucau District for a hydroelectric power plant. Two streams, Builai and Wainalale were selected to provide water to the power station. Construction began in 2006. A single 326 kW Pelton turbine-generator is located in the power station which was commissioned in November 2008. The project cost US$1.4 million which was funded by a grant from the Norwegian Water Resources and Energy Directorate.

References

Dams in East Timor
Dams completed in 2008
Energy infrastructure completed in 2008
Run-of-the-river power stations
Baucau Municipality
Hydroelectric power stations in East Timor